Wilhelm Uebler (28 February 1899 – 13 February 1968) was a German shot putter. He competed at the 1928 Summer Olympics and finished in sixth place.

References

1899 births
1968 deaths
People from Weißenburg-Gunzenhausen
Sportspeople from Middle Franconia
People from the Kingdom of Bavaria
German male shot putters
Olympic athletes of Germany
Athletes (track and field) at the 1928 Summer Olympics